Linda Pradel (born 4 June 1983) is a French handball player for Chambray Touraine Handball and the French national team.

References

1983 births
Living people
People from Trappes
Sportspeople from Yvelines
French female handball players
Expatriate handball players
French expatriate sportspeople in Spain
Competitors at the 2005 Mediterranean Games
Competitors at the 2009 Mediterranean Games
Mediterranean Games gold medalists for France
Mediterranean Games medalists in handball